AMSCOL (Adelaide Milk Supply Co-Operative Limited) was a South Australian milk and ice cream company. It was founded in 1922, and was bought out by Streets in the early 1980s. It was particularly well known for its range of ice creams, and its advertising slogan "It's a food, not a fad".

History
AMSCOL began with the Beauchamp brothers, who operated a milk delivery business from premises at 150 Carrington Street, Adelaide. They were sons of John Beachim Beauchamp (c. 1830 – 7 August 1913) who, in the late 1800s, left Somerset for South Australia, and after failing as farmers purchased a  dairy on Junction Road, Rosewater, where the younger brothers spent their childhood. John Beauchamp was married to Jane Caroline Beauchamp, née Baker (c. 1841 – 6 December 1897).

The brother about whom most is known is Walter John Chancellor Beauchamp (21 August 1884 – 25 January 1966), who started work delivering milk for James Anderson for three and a half years, then working for a similar time in Melbourne. On returning to Adelaide in 1909 he purchased a horse and milkcart, and soon had a "round" of 120 customers, delivering 24 gallons (110L) before 8:30am daily.
He brought in several of his brothers to operate the business. 
One brother, George W. Beauchamp left for America around 1906 and founded a thriving icecream business in Chicago. By 1926 he was a major shareholder in the Whelan Icecream Company and Hydrox Dairy Corporation, but had little day-to-day involvement.
A family photograph, taken at a reunion in 1926, includes the brothers Herbert, Frank, George, Walter, Harry, and Richard.

Beauchamp Brothers and James Anderson (as Anderson & Co.) were competitors in 1915, combined 1917 as Adelaide Milk Supply Company, employing 35 men, including 28 carters.
  
In 1922 the company Adelaide Milk Supply Co-operative Limited was set up to purchase the business of Beauchamp Brothers, with Walter John Beauchamp (the name "Chancellor", to distinguish him from an earlier son who died an infant, is seldom seen) as chairman of directors.
The only other brother who figures prominently in the company is Frank Beauchamp (Francis Charles Zebedee Steeds Beauchamp, 1879 – 27 September 1949), who was employed as works manager.

The company was set up on the Co-op model, with farmers supplying more or less milk depending on the number of shares held, and being paid according to its butterfat content.
By 1922 the company had 41 carts delivering to 26,000 homes a total of 4,000 gallons (18,000L) daily. They also supplied 50 vendors and eight or nine milk shops.

George W. Beauchamp returned to Adelaide in 1927 to help his brother install new icecream plant, and block ice manufacturing machinery capable of producing 70 tons of clear ice daily (this was 30 years before most houses had an electric refrigerator). He also advised on delivery of milk in bottles, rather than doling it out into "billy cans".

References

External links
 Photographs relating to AMSCOL, State Library of South Australia

Dairy products companies of Australia
Ice cream brands
Companies based in Adelaide
History of Adelaide
Economy of South Australia